Waldemar Adamczyk (born 3 July 1969) is a retired Polish football forward.

References

1969 births
Living people
Polish footballers
Hutnik Nowa Huta players
Xanthi F.C. players
OFI Crete F.C. players
Apollon Smyrnis F.C. players
Wisła Płock players
Śląsk Wrocław players
Ceramika Opoczno players
Zagłębie Sosnowiec players
Aluminium Konin players
Stal Stalowa Wola players
Przebój Wolbrom players
Aris Limassol FC players
Anagennisi Deryneia FC players
Association football defenders
Polish expatriate footballers
Expatriate footballers in Greece
Polish expatriate sportspeople in Greece
Expatriate footballers in Cyprus
Polish expatriate sportspeople in Cyprus
Poland international footballers
Footballers from Kraków